A chromatography detector is a device used in gas chromatography (GC) or liquid chromatography (LC) to detect components of the mixture being eluted off the chromatography column. There are two general types of detectors: destructive and non-destructive. The destructive detectors perform continuous transformation of the column effluent (burning, evaporation or mixing with reagents) with subsequent measurement of some physical property of the resulting material (plasma, aerosol or reaction mixture). The non-destructive detectors are directly measuring some property of the column eluent (for example UV absorption) and thus affords greater analyte recovery.

Destructive detectors
In liquid chromatography: 
 Charged aerosol detector (CAD)
 Evaporative light scattering detector (ELSD)

In gas chromatography: 
 Flame ionization detector (FID) 
 Flame photometric detector (FPD)
 Nitrogen Phosphorus Detector (NPD)
 Atomic-emission detector (AED)

In all types of chromatography:
 Mass spectrometer (MS)

Non-destructive detectors
In liquid chromatography:
UV detectors, fixed or variable wavelength, which includes diode array detector (DAD or PDA). The UV absorption of the effluent is continuously measured at single or multiple wavelengths. These are by far most popular detectors for LC.
 Fluorescence detector. Irradiates the effluent with a light of set wavelength and measure the fluorescence of the effluent at a single or multiple wavelength.
 Refractive index detector (RI or RID). Continuously measures the refractive index of the effluent. The lowest sensitivity of all detectors. Often used in size exclusion chromatography for polymer analysis.
 Radio flow detector. Measures radioactivity of the effluent. This detector can be destructive if a scintillation cocktail is continuously added to the effluent.
 Chiral detector continuously measures the optical angle of rotation of the effluent. It is used only when chiral compounds are being analyzed.
 Conductivity monitor. Continuously measures the conductivity of the effluent. Used only when conductive eluents (water or alcohols) are used.

In gas chromatography:
 Thermal conductivity detector, (TCD). Measures the thermal conductivity of the eluent.
 Electron capture detector, (ECD). The most sensitive detector known. Allows for the detection of organic molecules containing halogen, nitro groups etc.
 Photoionization detector, (PID). Measures the increase in conductivity achieved by ionizing the effluent gas with UV radiation.
 Olfactometric detector. Assesses the odour activity of the eluent using human assessors.

References

Chromatography
Detectors